(The) Dragon King may refer to:
 Dragon King, a deity in Chinese mythology commonly regarded as the divine ruler of the ocean
 The Dragon King (novel), a novel in the Crimson shadow series
 The Dragon King (Decide Your Destiny), a Doctor Who gamebook
 Dark Kingdom: The Dragon King, a fantasy mini-series
 Druk Gyalpo, title of the King of Bhutan
 Bahamut (Dungeons & Dragons), King of Dragons in Pathfinder / Dungeons and Dragons
 Onaga, also called the Dragon King, from the Mortal Kombat series

See also
 Dragon Kings (disambiguation)